Jacob Curry Mitchell ( – December 21, 1744) was an American deacon who became prominent in what is now North Yarmouth, Maine.

Early life 
Mitchell was born in Bridgewater, Massachusetts Bay Colony, to Jacob Mitchell I and Susannah Pope, both of whom died in 1675, when Jacob was around three years old, during the early stages of King Philip's War. He was raised by his uncle, Edward.

He married twice, to Deliverance Kingman (daughter of John Kingman and Elizabeth Edson), firstly, then in 1701 (after moving to Kingston, Rhode Island) to Rebecca Cushman, with whom he had at least four children: Jacob III (born 1696), Rebekah (1704), Seth (1705) and Isaac (1715), the latter named for his father-in-law.

In 1727, the couple moved north to North Yarmouth, Province of Massachusetts Bay, where Mitchell became a founder of the Meetinghouse under the Ledge, which stood between 1729 and 1836. The younger Mitchell also became a deacon there.

Also in 1727, Mitchell and four other local men—Samuel Seabury, James Parker, Gershom Rice and Phineas Jones—were tasked with the management of the new town of North Yarmouth, Maine. Their affairs included laying out the highways.

The Mitchell garrison home, built in 1728 or 1729, was located at the rear of today's Holy Cross Cemetery in Yarmouth. A stockade used during the Indian wars, a tunnel was built from the home's cellar to the nearby Royal River. The dirt path that looks like it leads to the water is actually the original stage road. Mitchell's family lived in the house between around 1729 and 1799, when one of Mitchell's sons, David, owned it. It then became the home of the Whitcombs, whose name is preserved on a street off Princes Point Road. It was demolished about 1900, and the farm land was purchased in 1916 to be replaced by the cemetery.

Death 
Mitchell died on December 21, 1744, aged 71 or 72. He was interred in the Pioneer Cemetery in today's Yarmouth, Maine. His father is buried in Yarmouth's Old Baptist Cemetery, while other members of the family (including his son) are buried in the Ledge Cemetery, adjacent to the Pioneer Cemetery.

References 

1672 births
1744 deaths
Deacons
People from Bridgewater, Massachusetts
People from North Yarmouth, Maine
People of colonial Massachusetts
People of colonial Maine
Burials in Maine
People of pre-statehood Maine